"Are You Sure?" is a song by  pop duo The Allisons, that represented the United Kingdom at the Eurovision Song Contest 1961, performed in English.

The song was performed 15th on the night of the contest, held on 18 March 1961, following 's Jean-Claude Pascal with "Nous les amoureux", and preceding 's Betty Curtis with "Al di là". "Are You Sure?" was also the first UK Eurovision entrant to become a Top Ten hit reaching #2 UK, the best chart showing for a UK Eurovision entrant until "Puppet on a String" by Sandie Shaw reached No. 1 in 1967.

The song was succeeded as the UK representative at the 1962 contest by Ronnie Carroll with "Ring-A-Ding Girl".

Chart performance

References

1961 singles
Eurovision songs of 1961
Eurovision songs of the United Kingdom
London Records singles
Fontana Records singles
1961 songs